Elieser Alexis Hernández (born May 3, 1995) is a Venezuelan professional baseball pitcher for the New York Mets of Major League Baseball (MLB). He was signed by the Houston Astros as an international free agent in 2012, and made his MLB debut with the Miami Marlins in 2018.

Career

Houston Astros
Hernández signed with the Houston Astros as an international free agent on May 31, 2012. He made his professional debut with the Dominican Summer League Astros. He spent the 2013 season with the DSL Astros as well, logging a 5–1 record and 1.26 ERA in 13 appearances. In 2014, he split the season between the GCL Astros and the rookie ball Greeneville Astros, accumulating a 5–1 record and 2.17 ERA in 12 games. He split the 2015 season between the Low-A Tri-City ValleyCats and the Single-A Quad Cities River Bandits, posting a 3–4 record and 3.12 ERA with 76 strikeouts in  innings of work. In 2016, Hernández split the year between the High-A Lancaster JetHawks and Quad Cities, recording a 6–8 record and 4.51 ERA with 107 strikeouts in  innings pitched. He split the 2017 season between the High-A Buies Creek Astros and the GCL Astros, pitching to a 5–5 record and 3.68 ERA in 18 appearances between the two teams.

Miami Marlins
On December 14, 2017, Hernández was selected by the Miami Marlins in the 2017 Rule 5 draft. He began the 2018 season on the disabled list with a tooth infection and was activated on May 10. He had been rehabbing with the High-A Jupiter Hammerheads and the Double-A Jacksonville Jumbo Shrimp. He again hit the disabled list on August 24 after suffering a blister on his middle finger, and rehabbed with the Triple-A New Orleans Baby Cakes. He finished his rookie season going 2–7 with a 5.21 ERA in  major league innings. He split the 2019 season between Miami and New Orleans, recording a 3–5 record and 5.03 ERA in 21 games for the Marlins. 

In 2020, Hernández pitched in 6 contests for the Marlins, registering a 3.16 ERA with 34 strikeouts in  innings pitched. On May 22, 2021, Hernández was placed on the 60-day injured list with a biceps injury. He was reinstated from the injured list on June 3. He returned to the 60-day injured list on June 5 after suffering a “severe” right quad strain. Hernández was again activated off of the IL on August 15 and pitched 5 innings of 1-run ball, earning a no-decision.

On November 15, 2022, Hernández was designated for assignment.

New York Mets
On November 18, 2022, the Marlins traded Hernández and Jeff Brigham to the New York Mets for Franklin Sanchez and a player to be named later or cash considerations. Jake Mangum went to Miami to complete the trade after he was not selected in the Rule 5 draft.

See also
Rule 5 draft results

References

External links

1995 births
Living people
Major League Baseball players from Venezuela
Venezuelan expatriate baseball players in the United States
Major League Baseball pitchers
Miami Marlins players
Dominican Summer League Astros players
Venezuelan expatriate baseball players in the Dominican Republic
Gulf Coast Astros players
Greeneville Astros players
Tri-City ValleyCats players
Quad City River Bandits players
Lancaster JetHawks players
Buies Creek Astros players
Águilas del Zulia players
Jupiter Hammerheads players
Jacksonville Jumbo Shrimp players
New Orleans Baby Cakes players
People from Ocumare del Tuy